Sorkhanjub-e Olya (also Romanized as Sorkhānjūb-e ‘Olyā; also known as Sorkhān Jūb, Sorkhān Jūb-e Bālā, Sorkhānjūb, and Sorkhūnjūy) is a village in Khaveh-ye Shomali Rural District, in the Central District of Delfan County, Lorestan Province, Iran. At the 2006 census, its population was 675, in 139 families.

References 

Towns and villages in Delfan County